Komedi Stambul (or simply Stambul), spelled Komedie Stamboel during the Dutch colonial era, is a form of trans-ethnic Indonesian folk theatre developed lately 19th-century to the mid 20th-century. The theatre originated in Dutch East Indies (modern-day Indonesia).

Stambul drew inspiration from a variety of styles including Malay, Western, and Chinese opera as well as Middle Eastern music and operetta.

See also

Toneel

References

Indonesian culture
Theatre in Indonesia
Traditional drama and theatre of Indonesia